The Pentax smc DA 14mm F2.8 ED (IF) is an interchangeable camera lens announced by Pentax on February 2, 2004.

References

External links
Official product page, Ricoh Imaging

Camera lenses introduced in 2004
14